Krasatinka is a rural locality (a village) in Krasninsky District of Smolensk Oblast, Russia.

The telephone dialing code is +7 48145, the postal code is 216100, and the OKATO code is 66224865007.

Geography

History
During World War II, the village was occupied by German troops in July 1941, and liberated in September 1943.

Rural localities in Smolensk Oblast